Agustín Sumuroy (better known as Juan Sumuroy) was a Filipino hero and Waray leader of the Sumuroy Rebellion, a rebellion of native Filipinos against colonial Spanish forces that occurred in eastern Visayas in 1649-1650.

Agustin Sumuroy is referred to by many as the Waray hero of the Palapag, Northern Samar rebellion during the Spanish time around 1649 to 1650.

There were several personalities in the said uprising: Don Juan Ponce (Ponce being a surname), the leader of the group; Don Pedro Caamug (Caamug being a surname), the second leaders; and Agustín Sumuroy and David Dula y Goiti, the third leader. The name Juan Ponce Sumuroy is sometimes given to Agustín usually as the result of confusion between Juan Ponce and Agustín Sumuroy.

During the height of the insurrection, Don Juan Ponce went hiding in Cebu and stayed with Fr. Ignacio Alcina, a Jesuit and historian. 

Sumuroy did not make peace with the Spaniards. He was killed by his own men. And his head, separated from his body, was presented to the Don Genis de Rojas by one of his men.

Legacy
Sumuroy is commemorated in the scientific name of species of gecko, Cyrtodactylus sumuroi, which is endemic to Samar.

References

 
People of Spanish colonial Philippines
Visayan people
Waray people
People from Northern Samar
1650 deaths